D. Logan Giffin (February 9, 1890 – August 24, 1980) was an American lawyer and politician.

Giffin was born in Macon County, Illinois. He went to the public schools in Argenta and Dalton City, Illinois. In 1911, he graduate from Valparaiso University and was admitted to the Illinois bar. Giffin practiced law in Springfield, Illinois and was a farmer. He served in the Illinois House of Representatives in 1931 and 1932. He also served in the Illinois Senate from 1945 to 1951. Giffin was a Republican. He died in Springfield, Illinois.

Notes

1890 births
1980 deaths
People from Macon County, Illinois
Politicians from Springfield, Illinois
Valparaiso University alumni
Farmers from Illinois
Illinois lawyers
Republican Party members of the Illinois House of Representatives
Republican Party Illinois state senators
20th-century American politicians
20th-century American lawyers